This is a list of the Coats of arms of the Russian Federation and its federal subjects.

Current coats of arms

Federation

Republics

Oblasts

Krais

Autonomous oblasts

Autonomous okrugs

Federal cities

Institutions

Former subjects

Historical coats of arms
1882–1917

1917–1923

1923–1993

Adygea

Altai

Bashkortostan

Buryatia

Chechnya

Chuvashia

Dagestan

Ingushetia

Kabardino-Balkaria

Kalmykia

Karachay-Cherkessia

Karelia

Khakassia

Komi

Mari El

Mordovia

North Ossetia–Alania

Sakha

Tatarstan

Tuva

Udmurtia

Amur Oblast

Arkhangelsk Oblast

Astrakhan Oblast

Belgorod Oblast

Bryansk Oblast

Chelyabinsk Oblast

Irkutsk Oblast

Ivanovo Oblast

Kaliningrad Oblast

Kaluga Oblast

Kemerovo Oblast

Kirov Oblast

Kostroma Oblast

Kurgan Oblast

Kursk Oblast

Leningrad Oblast

Lipetsk Oblast

Magadan Oblast

Moscow Oblast

Murmansk oblast

Nizhny Novgorod oblast

Novgorod Oblast

Novosibirsk Oblast

Omsk Oblast

Orenburg Oblast

Oryol Oblast

Penza Oblast

Pskov Oblast

Rostov Oblast

Ryazan Oblast

Sakhalin Oblast

Samara Oblast

Saratov Oblast

Smolensk Oblast

Sverdlovsk Oblast

Tambov Oblast

Tomsk Oblast

Tver Oblast

Tula Oblast

Tyumen Oblast

Ulyanovsk Oblast

Vladimir Oblast

Volgograd Oblast

Vologda Oblast

Voronezh Oblast

Yaroslavl Oblast

Altai Krai

Kamchatka Krai

Khabarovsk Krai

Krasnodar Krai

Krasnoyarsk Krai

Perm Krai

Primorsky Krai

Stavropol Krai

Zabaykalsky Krai

Jewish Autonomous Oblast

Chukotka Autonomous Okrug

Khanty-Mansi Autonomous Okrug

Nenets Autonomous Okrug

Yamalo-Nenets Autonomous Okrug

Other

Notes

See also
Flags of the federal subjects of Russia
Coat of arms of Russia
Emblems of the Soviet Republics